The Deland Travel Air 2000 is an American homebuilt aircraft that was designed and produced by Orlando Helicopter Airways, an aircraft maintenance and repair company located in DeLand, Florida. When it was available the aircraft was supplied as a kit for amateur construction and marketed under the "Deland" brand, named for the company's location. Plans were also available.

Design and development
The Deland Travel Air 2000 was developed from the original 1920s vintage Travel Air 2000, with the incorporation of numerous airframe improvements and the use of a modern engine.

The aircraft features an interplane strut, cabane strut and cable-braced biplane layout, a three-seat open cockpit, with two passengers accommodated in side-by-side configuration in the front open cockpit and the pilot in the rear cockpit with a windshield. The aircraft has fixed conventional landing gear and a single engine in tractor configuration.

The Deland Travel Air 2000 is made from a combination of metal and wood, all covered in doped aircraft fabric. The standard engine used is the  Thrust Mark VI powerplant.

Operational history
By 1998 the company reported that one kit had been sold, completed and was flying.

Specifications (Deland Travel Air 2000)

References

Deland Travel Air 2000
1990s United States sport aircraft
1990s United States civil utility aircraft
Single-engined tractor aircraft
Biplanes
Homebuilt aircraft